Vadleány comes from Central European (Hungarian) folklore.  She is a forest sprite—her name means "Forest Girl" (literal translation: wild girl) -- who seduces wanderers and steals their strength. She is usually naked and has extremely long hair.

The vadleány appear in the fictional world of El Arcana  as woodland nymphs who lure men into the woods and then drain their energy.  It also appears to be a not-infrequent pseudonym for teenage girls from Russia or Scandinavia.

References
El Arcana: Vadleany

Female legendary creatures
Hungarian legendary creatures
Sprites (folklore)